Some Christian denominations believe that a sacramental character, an indelible spiritual mark (the meaning of the word character in Latin), is imprinted by any of three of the seven sacraments: baptism, confirmation, and holy orders.

History 
The doctrine was expressed by Augustine of Hippo in his religious controversies. The doctrine of the sacramental character was dogmatically defined at the 16th century Council of Trent.

Teaching by Christian denomination

Catholicism
This teaching is expressed as follows in the Catechism of the Catholic Church (1992), §1121:

If it is doubtful whether a person has received the sacrament, the sacrament may be administered conditionally (using words such as for conditional baptism: "If thou art not baptized, I baptize thee in the name of the Father and of the Son and of the Holy Spirit"). However, such an administration is only valid and effective to the extent that no valid administration of the same sacrament has already occurred, as it does not in any event constitute an effective repetition of a valid previous administration of that sacrament.

The Catechism of the Catholic Church §698, explains as follows the significance of the image of "seal", used as an alternative to that of "character":

Lutheranism
Lutheran theologian Wolfhart Pannenberg stated that "in terms of the thought of promise and sending that constantly govern the ordained and claim them for Christ's service, we no longer need to oppose [indelible character] on the Lutheran side, since this point of view finds expression in the Lutheran churches, too. Here there is no repetition of ordination."

Anglicanism
The Book of Common Prayer of the Protestant Episcopal Church in the United States of America teaches that "The bond which God establishes in Baptism is indissoluble".

See also 
Sacraments (Catholic Church)
Lutheran sacraments
Anglican sacraments
Conditional sacrament
Sacramental matter and form

References

Further reading
"Character (in Catholic Theology)", Catholic Encyclopedia

Catholic theology and doctrine
Sacraments of the Catholic Church
Sacramental theology